"Doubts Even Here", originally called "Tiny Tim", is the seventh track of eight on New Order's debut album Movement, released on November 13, 1981. After the death of Joy Division singer Ian Curtis, the remaining members formed New Order with drummer Stephen Morris's girlfriend Gillian Gilbert joining five months later. This led to all three male members attempting vocals. "Doubts Even Here" and "Dreams Never End" on Movement are sung by bassist Peter Hook with spoken contributions by Gillian Gilbert. The song starts off with an array of electronic percussion noises before slow synth and bass riffs enter, which eventually pick up speed later in the song. The lyrics were written by Stephen Morris. The song has not been performed live since a few performances in 1981.

Versions

Official versions
Album version – 4:16

Remixes
"Doubts Even Here" (Razed Club Mix) (unofficial remix by Razed in a New Division of Agony) – 4:32

Covers by other artists
Harry on Essence (New Order Tribute) – 3:46
Phantom West on Community 2: A NewOrderOnline Tribute – 4:18
Philip Eno as an entry for the Community 2 contest – 4:02
Razed in a New Division of Agony on Ceremony: A New Order Tribute – 4:33
Vibrissae on Dreams Never End - A Tribute to New Order – 6:00

References

New Order (band) songs
Song recordings produced by Martin Hannett
1981 songs
Songs written by Peter Hook
Songs written by Bernard Sumner
Songs written by Stephen Morris (musician)
Songs written by Gillian Gilbert